The 1995–96 Illinois State Redbirds men's basketball team represented Illinois State University during the 1995–96 NCAA Division I men's basketball season. The Redbirds, led by third year head coach Kevin Stallings, played their home games at Redbird Arena and were a member of the Missouri Valley Conference.

The Redbirds finished the season 22–12, 13–5 in conference play to finish in second place. They were the number two seed for the Missouri Valley Conference tournament. They won their quarterfinal game versus the University of Northern Iowa and lost their semifinal game versus the University of Tulsa.

The Redbirds received an invitation to the 1996 National Invitation Tournament. They beat Mount St. Mary's University in the first round, the University of Wisconsin in the second round, and were defeated by Tulane University in the quarterfinal round.

Roster

Schedule

|-
!colspan=9 style=|Regular Season

|-
!colspan=9 style=|Diet PepsiMissouri Valley Conference {MVC} tournament

|-
!colspan=9 style=|National Invitation {NIT} tournament

References

Illinois State Redbirds men's basketball seasons
Illinois State
Illinois State